Borut may refer to:

Places
Borut, a settlement in Neum; see List of populated places in Bosnia and Herzegovina

People
Borut Bilač (born 1965), Slovenian long jumper
Borut Božič (born 1980), Slovenian professional road racing cyclist
Borut Javornik (born 1967), Slovenian slalom canoer
Borut Justin, Yugoslav slalom canoer
Borut Mavrič (born 1970), Slovenian international footballer
Borut Pahor (born 1963), Slovenian politician, Prime Minister of Slovenia from 2008 to 2012
Borut Petrič (born 1961), Slovenian freestyle swimmer
Borut Plaskan (born 1966), professional handball player
Borut Semler (born 1985), Slovenian footballer
Borut Urh (born 1974), Slovenian professional tennis player

See also
Borat (disambiguation)
Borot (disambiguation)

Slavic masculine given names
Slovene masculine given names